"What You Don't Know" is a pop ballad written by Mattias Lindblom, Billy Mann, and Anders Wollbeck for German pop trio Monrose's second studio album, Strictly Physical (2007). It was co-produced by production teams Jiant and Snowflakers and released as the album's third single on 7 December 2007 (see 2007 in music). The song has since reached the top ten in Germany and Slovenia.

Music video
The video for "What You Don't Know" was shot on 13 November 2007 in Hamburg, Germany, and world premiered on November 23 on German music network VIVA's show Viva Live!.

At the beginning of the video, a woman leaves her bed while her male partner looks on. She seemingly ignores him. The three women of Monrose are then seen over an intersection standing and singing between shots. Bahar is seen throughout the video along with her reflection, walking streets, while Senna is seen in the backseat of a car. Mandy is shown alone. The woman of the story lives her life while the man follows, and she continues in not noticing him. By the end of the video, it is revealed that he is dead, and was killed in an automobile accident. She loved him then and still. His body fades as he learns the truth, and the video comes to a close.

Formats and track listings
These are the formats and track listings of major single-releases of "What You Don't Know".

CD single
 "What You Don't Know" (Album Version) - 3:45
 "What You Don't Know" (Candlelight Mix) - 3:49
 "Say Yes" - 3:53
 "What You Don't Know" (Instrumental) - 3:45

Charts

Weekly charts

Year-end charts

References

External links
 
 

2000s ballads
2007 singles
Monrose songs
Pop ballads
Songs written by Billy Mann
Songs written by Anders Wollbeck
Songs written by Mattias Lindblom
2007 songs